Dazzle camouflage of warships was adopted by the U.S. Navy during World War II, following research at the Naval Research Laboratory. Dazzle consists in painting obtrusive patterns on vertical surfaces. Unlike some other forms of camouflage, dazzle works not by offering concealment but by making it difficult to estimate a target's range, speed and heading. Each ship's dazzle pattern was unique to make it more difficult for the enemy to recognize different classes of ships. The result was that a profusion of dazzle schemes were tried, and the evidence for their success was at best mixed. 

Dazzle camouflage patterns used on destroyers are presented here; Measures 31, 32 and 33 referred to dark, medium and light color combinations.

Colors

Patterns

Notes

See also

World War II ship camouflage measures of the United States Navy
World War II US Navy dazzle camouflage measures 31, 32 and 33: aircraft carriers
World War II US Navy dazzle camouflage measures 31, 32 and 33: battleships
World War II US Navy dazzle camouflage measures 31, 32 and 33: cruisers

World War II ships of the United States
Vehicle markings
Camouflage
Military camouflage
Camouflage patterns